UnitedHealthcare Pro Cycling Team (UCI identifier: UHC) was a professional road bicycle racing team, run by Momentum Sports Group and based in the United States.  The team is sponsored principally by UnitedHealth Group.  It began at the end of 2009 as a reorganization of the OUCH Pro Cycling Team, with headlining cyclist Floyd Landis leaving the team.  The team folded at the end of the 2018 season, with the main sponsor transferring to Rally Cycling.

Team roster

Major wins

2003
Stage 1 Sea Otter Classic, Mike Sayers
Stage 3 GP de Beauce, Gordon Fraser
Stage 1 Herald Sun Tour, Mike Sayers
2004
Prologue Sea Otter Classic, Hayden Godfrey
Stage 1 & 7 Tour de Georgia, Gordon Fraser
Stage 5 Tour de Georgia, Jason McCartney
 Road Race Championship, Gordon Fraser
Stage 7 Tour de l'Avenir, Tyler Farrar
2005
Overall Redlands Bicycle Classic, Chris Wherry
Prologue, Chris Wherry
Overall Sea Otter Classic, Doug Ollerenshaw
Prologue, Gordon Fraser
Stage 2, Doug Ollerenshaw
Stage 6 Tour de Georgia, Gordon Fraser
Stage 3b Ronde de l'Isard, Tyler Farrar
Wachovia Invitational, Greg Henderson
Wachovia Classic, Gordon Fraser
Wachovia USPRO Championships, Chris Wherry
Stage 6 GP de Beauce, Doug Ollerenshaw
USPRO Criterium Championship, Tyler Farrar
Stage 2 Tour de l'Avenir, Tyler Farrar
2006
 Australia, Time Trial Championships, Nathan O'Neill
Overall Tour de Taiwan, Kirk O'Bee
Stage 5, Kirk O'Bee
Reading Classic, Greg Henderson
Wachovia Cycling Series – Philadelphia, Greg Henderson
Stage 2 Herald Sun Tour, Karl Menzies
 New Zealand, Road Race Championship, Hayden Roulston
2007
 Australia, Time Trial Championships, Nathan O'Neill
Stage 1 Tour Down Under, Karl Menzies
Overall Tour de Taiwan, Shawn Milne
Stage 1, Shawn Milne
, Time Trial Championships, Ryder Hesjedal
2008
Overall Tour de Taiwan, John Murphy
Stage 6, Kyle Gritters
Stage 8 Tour of Southland, Kirk O'Bee
2009
Stage 6 Vuelta Mexico Telmex, Cameron Evans
Stage 8 Vuelta Mexico Telmex, Andrew Pinfold
2010
Stage 3 & 5 Tour de Beauce, Marc de Maar
 Netherlands Antilles, Road Race Championships, Marc de Maar
 Netherlands Antilles, Time Trial Championships, Marc de Maar
2011
Stage 8 Tour de Langkawi, Robert Förster
Stage 2a Vuelta a Asturias, Robert Förster
Stage 4 Tour of Qinghai Lake, Robert Förster
Stage 1 Tour of Elk Grove, Karl Menzies
Stage 3 Tour of Elk Grove, Hilton Clarke
2012
 Road Race Championships, Marc de Maar
 Time Trial Championships, Marc de Maar
Overall Tour of the Gila, Rory Sutherland
Stage 1, Rory Sutherland
Overall Tour de Beauce, Rory Sutherland
Stage 1 Tour of Utah, Rory Sutherland
Stage 4 Tour of Utah, Jake Keough
Stage 1 Volta a Portugal, Jay Thomson
Stage 6 Volta a Portugal, Jason McCartney
Stage 7 Volta a Portugal, Kai Reus
Stage 6 USA Pro Cycling Challenge, Rory Sutherland
Stage 5 Tour of Britain, Marc de Maar
2013
 World Track Championships (Scratch race), Martyn Irvine
Overall Tour of the Gila, Philip Deignan
Stage 4, Kiel Reijnen
Philly Cycling Classic, Kiel Reijnen
Stage 5 Tour de Beauce, Marc de Maar
 National Track Championships (Individual pursuit), Martyn Irvine
 National Track Championships (Scratch race), Martyn Irvine
Stage 6 Tour of Qinghai Lake, Robert Förster
Stage 13 Tour of Qinghai Lake, Jake Keough
Stage 10 Volta a Portugal, Jake Keough
Bucks County Classic, Kiel Reijnen
2014
Stage 5 Tour de Langkawi, Bradley White
Stage 1 Tour de Taiwan, Luke Keough
Stage 2 Tour of Norway, Marc de Maar
The Philadelphia Cycling Classic, Kiel Reijnen
Stage 1 USA Pro Cycling Challenge, Kiel Reijnen
 National Track Championships (Team pursuit), Adrian Hegyvary
 National Criterium Championships, John Murphy
2015
Overall Joe Martin Stage Race, John Murphy
Stages 2 & 3, John Murphy 
Stage 1 Tour of Utah, Kiel Reijnen
Stage 3 USA Pro Cycling Challenge, Kiel Reijnen
Stage 7 USA Pro Cycling Challenge, John Murphy
2016 
Stage 4 Herald Sun Tour, John Murphy
Stage 3 Tour de Langkawi, John Murphy
Stage 3 Joe Martin Stage Race, Carlos Alzate
Stage 5 Tour of the Gila, Daniel Jaramillo
Stage 5 Tour of Japan, Daniel Jaramillo
2017 
Stage 3 Herald Sun Tour, Travis McCabe 
Stages 2 & 8 Tour de Langkawi, Travis McCabe
Stage 3 Tour de Taiwan, Daniel Summerhill
Stage 2 Joe Martin Stage Race, Lucas Sebastián Haedo
Stages 2, 3 & 9 Tour du Maroc, Luke Keough
 Overall Tour de Hongrie, Daniel Jaramillo
Stage 4, Daniel Jaramillo 
Stage 5 Tour of Utah, Travis McCabe
2018
Stage 3 (ITT) Tour of the Gila, Serghei Țvetcov
Stage 5 Tour of the Gila, Gavin Mannion
Overall Tour de Korea, Serghei Țvetcov
Stage 3, Serghei Țvetcov
Stage 3a Tour de Beauce, Serghei Țvetcov
Chrono Kristin Armstrong, Serghei Țvetcov
Stages 1 & 3 Tour of Utah, Travis McCabe 
Stage 2 (ITT) Colorado Classic, Gavin Mannion
Stage 2 Tour of Romania, Serghei Țvetcov

National and world champions

2006
 Australia Time Trial Championships, Nathan O'Neill
 New Zealand Road Race Championship, Hayden Roulston
2007
 Australia Time Trial Championships, Nathan O'Neill
 Canada Time Trial Championships, Ryder Hesjedal
2010
 Netherlands Antilles Road Race Championships, Marc de Maar
 Netherlands Antilles Time Trial Championships, Marc de Maar
2012
 Curaçao Road Race Championships Marc de Maar
 Curaçao Time Trial Championships, Marc de Maar
2013
 World Track Championships (Scratch race), Martyn Irvine
 National Track Championships (Individual pursuit), Martyn Irvine
 National Track Championships (Scratch race), Martyn Irvine
2014
 National Track Championships (Team pursuit), Adrian Hegyvary
 National Criterium Championships, John Murphy

See also
 UnitedHealthcare Pro Cycling (women's team)

References

External links
 Official site

Cycling teams based in the United States
UCI Professional Continental teams
Cycling teams established in 2003